Kyllinia marchadi is a species of sea snail, a marine gastropod mollusk in the family Mangeliidae.

Description
The length of the shell attains 4.2 mm.

Distribution
This marine species occurs in the Atlantic Ocean off Senegal, Guinea and Angola.

References

 Knudsen, J. 1956. Remarks on a collection of marine Prosobranchs from Senegal Bulletin de l’Institut Franc¸ais d’Afrique Noire. XVIII, s. A, 2:514–529.

External links
  Tucker, J.K. 2004 Catalog of recent and fossil turrids (Mollusca: Gastropoda). Zootaxa 682:1–1295.
 
 MNHN, Paris: holotype

marchadi
Gastropods described in 1956